Justine Lumumba Kasule is a Ugandan educator and politician. She is the current Minister, Office of the Prime Minister (General Duties), in the cabinet of Uganda, since June 2021. 

Before that, she was the Secretary General of the National Resistance Movement, the ruling political party in Uganda. She was appointed to that position on 23 December 2014, replacing Amama Mbabazi. Prior to that, she served as the Chief Government Whip in the Cabinet of Uganda from May 2011 until December 2014. Justine Lumumba Kasule also served as the elected Member of Parliament for Bugiri District Women's Representative, from 2001, until her resignation in December 2014.

Background and education
She was born in Bugiri District on 22 November 1972. She attended St. Anthony Senior Secondary School in Nkokonjeru for her O-level studies. She then transferred to St. Joseph's Secondary School at Naggalama, for her A-Level education. In 1993, she was admitted to Makerere University, where she graduated with the degree of Bachelor of Arts with a concurrent Diploma in Education, in 1996.

Career
From 1996 until 1997 she worked as a teacher. From 1997 until 1998, she worked as the Acting District Inspector of Schools in her home district. From 1998 until 2001, she worked as a Senior Education Officer at the Ministry of Education. In 2001, she was elected to the Parliament, on the National Resistance Movement political party ticket, to serve as the Women's Representative for Bugiri District. She was re-elected from 2001 until 2014, when she stepped down to become secretary general of the ruling National Resistance Movement political party. In May 2011, she was appointed as Government Chief Whip, replacing John Nasasira.

Other considerations
She is a married mother with two sons. She is a Roman Catholic.

See also
Cabinet of Uganda
Parliament of Uganda

References

External links
 Full of List of Ugandan Cabinet Ministers May 2011

Living people
1972 births
Government ministers of Uganda
Members of the Parliament of Uganda
Makerere University alumni
National Resistance Movement politicians
People from Bugiri District
People from Eastern Region, Uganda
21st-century Ugandan women politicians
21st-century Ugandan politicians
Women government ministers of Uganda
Women members of the Parliament of Uganda